Alan Young (born 12 August 1983 in England) is an English retired footballer.

References

English footballers
Association football forwards
Living people
1983 births
Swindon Town F.C. players